The Mannington Drillers were a minor league baseball team that represented Mannington, West Virginia in the Class D West Virginia League. The team placed second in the league standings but existed for only the 1910 season and was Mannington's only professional baseball team to date. The team is also listed as just Mannington in several sources.

Year-by-year record

References
Baseball Reference - Mannington, West Virginia

Baseball teams established in 1910
Defunct minor league baseball teams
West Virginia League teams
1910 establishments in West Virginia
1910 disestablishments in West Virginia
Sports clubs disestablished in 1910
Professional baseball teams in West Virginia
Marion County, West Virginia
Defunct baseball teams in West Virginia
Baseball teams disestablished in 1910